Bathybembix bairdii, common name Baird's top shell, is a species of deep-water sea snail, a marine gastropod mollusc in the family Eucyclidae.

Description
The size of the shell varies between 38 mm and 50 mm.

Distribution
This species occurs in the Pacific Ocean from the Bering Sea to Chile at depths between 300 m and 1500 m.

References

 McLean J.H. (1996). The Prosobranchia. In: Taxonomic Atlas of the Benthic Fauna of the Santa Maria Basin and Western Santa Barbara Channel. The Mollusca Part 2 – The Gastropoda. Santa Barbara Museum of Natural History. volume 9: 1–160
 Turgeon, D.D., et al. 1998. Common and scientific names of aquatic invertebrates of the United States and Canada. American Fisheries Society Special Publication 26 page(s): 60

External links
 

bairdii
Gastropods described in 1889